Chris or Christopher King may refer to:
Christopher King (umpire) (born 1944), New Zealand cricket umpire
Chris King (philatelist) (born 1948), British philatelist
Chris King (actor) (born 1956), Australian actor
Chris Thomas King (born 1962), American blues musician and actor
Chris King (basketball) (born 1969), American NBA basketball player
Chris King (soccer) (born 1969), American soccer player
Chris King (rugby league) (born 1969), Australian rugby league player
Christopher J. King (born 1976), Pennsylvania state representative
Chris King (footballer) (born 1980), English footballer
Chris King (rugby union) (born 1981), New Zealand rugby union player
Chris King (musician), guitarist for American band This Will Destroy You
Chris King (game designer), British designer and producer of video games
Christopher "Chris" King, a fictional character in the DC Comics universe

See also
Christine King, British historian and university administrator